Ancestral Song is an album by Ethnic Heritage Ensemble, an American jazz band formed in the mid-1970s by percussionist Kahil El'Zabar. The album, featuring saxophonist Edward Wilkerson, who joined the group in 1978, and trombonist Joseph Bowie, the third player in the band since 1986, was recorded live at Fasching Club, Stockholm in 1987 and released on the Swedish Silkheart label.

Reception

The Penguin Guide to Jazz states "Ancestral Song was a somewhat modest start, with Bowie's lines offering only cautious counterpoint to Wilkerson's intensities."

Track listing
All compositions by Kahil El'Zabar
 "Papa's Bounce" – 9:35
 "Loose Pocket" – 15:15 
 "Ancestral Song" – 13:25 
 "Mamma's House" – 10:35
 "Three and a Half" – 8:20
 "Kahil's Blues" – 6:00 
5 & 6 does not appear on original LP

Personnel
Kahil El'Zabar – sansa, drums, earth-drum, percussion, voice
Edward Wilkerson – tenor sax, clarinet, percussion
Joseph Bowie – trombone, marimba, percussion

References

1988 live albums
Kahil El'Zabar live albums
Silkheart Records live albums